The name Bebeng has been used for twelve tropical cyclones in the Philippines by PAGASA in the Western Pacific.

 Tropical Storm Rose (1963) (T6303, 10W, Bebeng)
 Typhoon Sally (1967) (T6702, 02W, Bebeng)
 Tropical Storm Thelma (1971) (T7102, 02W, Bebeng)
 Typhoon Nina (1975) (T7503, 04W, Bebeng), struck China causing the failure of the Banqiao Dam, eventually killing over 200,000 people
 Typhoon Cecil (1979) (T7903, 03W, Bebeng), struck the Philippines
 Typhoon Vera (1983) (T8303, 03W, Bebeng), struck the Philippines
 Typhoon Sperry (1987) (T8704, 04W, Bebeng)
 Tropical Storm Vanessa (1991) (T9103, 03W, Bebeng), struck the Philippines
 Typhoon Gary (1995) (T9504, 07W, Bebeng), struck China
 Tropical Storm Iris (Bebeng) (1999) (02W, Bebeng), remained in the open ocean
 Typhoon Man-yi (2007) (T0704, 04W, Bebeng), struck Japan
 Tropical Storm Aere (2011) (T1101, 03W, Bebeng), struck the Philippines

The name Bebeng was retired by the PAGASA after the 2011 typhoon season and replaced by Betty.

Pacific typhoon set index articles